Vijnaana Rathnaakaram was a literary magazine started in 1913 in the old Native State of Travancore, India. J Thomas Kayalackakom was its founder publisher and Mahakavi Kattakayam Cherian Mappillai was its Editor. It was the second literary magazine of Travancore, and one of the early such publications in Malayalam language. Contributors in the magazine included Kerala Varma Valiyakoyi Thampuran, C V Raman Pillai, A. R. Rajaraja Varma, Ulloor S. Parameswara Iyer, and Vallathol Narayana Menon, K. C. Kesava Pillai.

References

Kattakayam Cherian Mappillai

1913 establishments in India
Defunct magazines published in India
Defunct literary magazines
Literary magazines published in India
Magazines established in 1913
Malayalam-language magazines
Magazines with year of disestablishment missing
Mass media in Kerala